Yosi Ben-Dov is an Israeli educator, manager and university lecturer.

Biography
Ben-Dov was born in Haifa, Israel in 1950. He studied at The Hebrew Reali School from 1956 to 1968, and was active at the Israel Boy and Girl Scouts Federation (Tzofim) youth movement. He served the army at a "Nahal" unit, establishing kibbutz and Israeli settlement Mevo Hama at the southern part of the Golan Heights.

Academic life

Ben-Dov did his undergraduate studies at the Hebrew University of Jerusalem in Mathematics, Statistics and Economics. He later joined the PhD program at the Industrial Engineering and Operations Research (IEOR) department of the University of California, Berkeley, where he studied from 1973–1977, receiving a Ph.D. in Operations Research in 1977. His thesis, Optimal Testing Procedures for Coherent Systems, was written under the supervision of Prof. Richard E. Barlow. Later Ben-Dov taught at Michigan State University, at the Hebrew University of Jerusalem and at the Wharton School of the University of Pennsylvania.

Professional career

In 1986 Ben-Dov started working on Wall Street at Prudential Securities as the managing director of the Financial Strategies Group. In 1991 he was the Director of the Rappaport Institute near the Rambam Hospital and in 1995 he joined Amdocs as a Senior Vice President in charge of the Haifa branch in Israel.

In 1999 Ben-Dov became the CEO of Schema, a Wireless Optimization company which was later acquired by TEOCO, and in 2008 became the CEO of Time To Know, an education technology company that provided a holistic solution to the K–12 classroom, which included a Digital Teaching Platform together with interactive core curriculum.

Ben-Dov became the principal and managing director of The Hebrew Reali School in Haifa at the beginning of 2014. During his tenure he has been involved in a funding dispute with the education ministry.
On September 1, 2017, a new building was inaugurated at the Ahuza branch of the Reali School, donated by the Heichal Eliyahu organization. The building has classrooms, an auditorium and a center for Jewish-Israeli culture. In October 2018, makerspaces were inaugurated at the school thanks to a contribution by Dr. Miriam Adelson, who attended the real school from first to twelfth grade, and her husband Sheldon Adelson.
In the Corona year (2021-2020) the Reali School excelled in managing distance learning by adopting “hybrid learning” conducted in all school classrooms using quality cameras that captured classroom lessons and large TV screens that allowed teachers to follow and share the class with students at home. During that year, the traditional Memorial Day ceremony, which includes all 4,200 students of the school each year, as well as many thousands of graduates, was broadcast live for the first time. In September 2021, two more kindergartens were opened in the "Realigan" chain, bringing the number of kindergartens in the chain to eight.

Personal life
Ben-Dov is married to Prof. Nitza Ben-Dov, the 2021 recipient of the prestigious Israel Prize for Literary Criticism. They have three children: Merav, Michal and Jacob. They live in Haifa, Israel.

Publications

External links
Google Scholar
Mathematics  Genealogy

References

Hebrew University of Jerusalem alumni
University of California, Berkeley alumni
Michigan State University faculty
University of Pennsylvania faculty
Wharton School of the University of Pennsylvania faculty
Academic staff of the Hebrew University of Jerusalem
Israeli operations researchers
Hebrew Reali School alumni
Heads of schools in Israel
People from Haifa
Israeli chief executives
1950 births
Living people